The 1947 National Football League Draft was held on December 16, 1946, at the Commodore Hotel in New York City, New York.

The National Football League in this draft made the first overall pick, a bonus pick determined by lottery. The Chicago Bears won the first lottery, and used the pick to select halfback Bob Fenimore. This lottery process ended in 1958.

Player selections

Hall of Famers
 Dante Lavelli, end from Ohio State University taken 12th round 103rd overall by the Los Angeles Rams. 
Inducted: Professional Football Hall of Fame class of 1975.
 Tom Landry, defensive back from Texas taken 20th round 184th overall by the New York Giants.
Inducted: For his Coaching achievements Professional Football Hall of Fame Class of 1990
 Art Donovan, defensive tackle from Boston College taken 22nd round 204th overall by the New York Giants
Inducted: Professional Football Hall of Fame class of 1968.

Notable undrafted players

Summary

Schools with multiple draft selections

Notes

References

External links
 NFL.com – 1947 Draft
 databaseFootball.com – 1947 Draft
 Pro Football Hall of Fame

National Football League Draft
Draft
NFL Draft
NFL Draft
American football in New York City
Sports in Manhattan
Sporting events in New York City
1940s in Manhattan